Events from the year 1721 in France.

Incumbents 
Monarch: Louis XV
Regent: Philip II of Orleans

Events

Births
 October 19 – Joseph de Guignes, French orientalist (d. 1800)
 December 6  –  Guillaume-Chrétien de Lamoignon de Malesherbes, French statesman (d.  1794)
 December 29 – Marquise de Pompadour, mistress of King Louis XV of France (d.  1764)

Deaths
 April 14 – Michel Chamillart, French statesman (b. 1652)
 July 18 – Antoine Watteau, French painter (b. 1684)
 August 13 – Jacques Lelong, French bibliographer (b. 1665)
 Henri Arnaud, French pastor and leader of the Waldenses (b. 1641)

See also

References

1720s in France